2,5-Dimethoxybenzaldehyde is an organic compound and a benzaldehyde derivative. One of its uses is the production of 2,5-dimethoxyphenethylamine, also known as 2C-H. 2C-H is used to produce many other substituted phenethylamines such as 2C-B, 2C-I and 2C-C.

References

Benzaldehydes
Methoxy compounds